Oestreich is a German surname. Notable people with the surname include:

Elisabeth Oestreich (1909–1994), German middle-distance runner
James R. Oestreich (born 1943), American music critic
Markus Oestreich (born 1963), German racing driver
Nancy Oestreich Lurie (1924–2017), American anthropologist
Paul Oestreich (1878–1959), German educator

German-language surnames